"You'll Never Get to Heaven (If You Break My Heart)" is a song composed by Burt Bacharach, with lyrics by Hal David. It was originally recorded by Dionne Warwick in 1964, who charted at number 34 in the US Billboard Hot 100 with her version. It was covered by the Stylistics in 1973, who reached number 23 in the US with their cover.

Dionne Warwick version
Dionne Warwick recorded "You'll Never Get to Heaven (If You Break My Heart)" in 1964, and released it as the second single release from her third studio album. The song was an international hit, reaching number 34 on the US Billboard Hot 100 and number 28 on the Cash Box Top 100. It did better elsewhere, peaking at number 20 in the UK and at number 15 in Canada. The B-side, "A House Is Not a Home", was also a chart hit, reaching number 71 on Billboard, number 50 on Cash Box and number 37 in Canada.

Chart performance

The Stylistics version

The Stylistics covered the song "You'll Never Get to Heaven (If You Break My Heart)" in 1973.  It was the third and final single from their second album.  Their version was yet more successful in the US, peaking at number 23 on Billboard and number 16 on Cash Box. It was also an Adult Contemporary hit, reaching number four.

Chart performance

Extended play version

Other versions
Madagascar pop group Les Surfs, recorded the song in French as "Tu n'iras par au ciel" in the 1960s.
Cal Tjader included a version of the song on his 1968 album, "Sounds Out Burt Bacharach".
Cilla Black recorded and released the song in 1969.  
Esquires Now recorded a reggae version on "Born to Win" in 1973.
It was also recorded by Aretha Franklin in 1974.
Rahsaan Roland Kirk released a live version on Bright Moments (Rahsaan Roland Kirk album) (1974).
A cover version by Daniel Johnston is included on 1983's "More Songs of Pain".
5446 recorded a disco version in the UK in 1991 from their Taxi Singles 2 LP.

References

External links
 Lyrics of this song
 
 

1964 songs
1964 singles
1973 singles
Songs with music by Burt Bacharach
Songs with lyrics by Hal David
Avco Records singles
Scepter Records singles
Dionne Warwick songs
The Stylistics songs